Johann Tobias Mayer (5 May 1752 – 30 November 1830) was a German physicist.  He was mainly well known for his mathematics and natural science textbooks.  Anfangsgründe der Naturlehre zum Behuf der Vorlesungen über die Experimental-Physik, an 1801 physics text, was the most influential of its time in the German-speaking countries.  Mayer's research in experimental physics and astronomy appeared in Annalen der Physik.  He is not to be confused with his famous father, the astronomer Tobias Mayer.

Personal and professional life 

Mayer, born in Göttingen, was the first child of Maria and Tobias Mayer.  The elder Mayer, himself a well-known Göttingen professor of geography, physics, and astronomy, died in 1762 when Johann was only ten.

In 1769, Johann Mayer began studying theology and philosophy at the relatively new Georg-August University of Göttingen under Abraham Gotthelf Kästner (and later also with Georg Christoph Lichtenberg).  After graduating in 1773, Mayer worked as a lecturer in mathematics and as an astronomer.  On 17 November 1779, he was called to the University of Altdorf, where he worked from 1780 to 1786.  He later taught mathematics and physics at Friedrich-Alexander-University, Erlangen-Nuremberg, and in 1799, he succeeded Lichtenberg at Göttingen.  His students included Enno Heeren Dirksen, who, after obtaining his doctorate in 1820, advised Carl Gustav Jacob Jacobi.

Mayer and his wife, Johanna, had five children. Mayer died in Göttingen.

The Leonardo da Vinci Proof of the Pythagorean Theorem 

A proof of the Pythagorean theorem ascribed to Leonardo da Vinci is now claimed to have been authored by Mayer in 1772.

See also
Lorentz force

References

External links 
 Entry in the Mathematics Genealogy Project
 Astronomie in Nürnberg (in German) 

1752 births
1830 deaths
18th-century German mathematicians
University of Göttingen alumni
Academic staff of the University of Göttingen
19th-century German physicists
19th-century German mathematicians
18th-century German physicists
Scientists from Göttingen